Rajesh Vithal Pawar (born 6 September 1979), in Bombay, Maharashtra, is an Indian cricketer who played for Mumbai in domestic cricket. He is a slow left-arm orthodox bowler and a handy left-handed batsman. Pawar has taken over 200 first-class wickets and has achieved a highest score with the bat of 95 not out. He played for Mumbai, Baroda and Andhra Pradesh in the Ranji Trophy. In January 2007, he was named in India's 30-man preliminary squad for the World Cup and despite not making the final 15, he was included in the test squad for a test series against Bangladesh following the tournament. He traveled via Auto Rickshaw in his first match versus Bangladesh.

He leads the team 'Parkophene Cricketers' in the Kanga League.

External links
 
http://www.asianage.com/sports/cricket/190917/city-veteran-aims-for-one-last-shot.html

1979 births
Living people
Indian cricketers
Mumbai cricketers
Baroda cricketers
West Zone cricketers
Mumbai Indians cricketers
Delhi Capitals cricketers
Andhra cricketers